Squadron Leader Johannes Jacobus le Roux  (12 April 1920 – 19 September 1944) was a South African World War II flying ace, who flew for the Royal Air Force. He is credited with 23.5 kills

He joined the RAF in 1939.

Le Roux is one of three pilots who claimed responsibility for attacking and seriously injuring General Erwin Rommel in his staff car on a road outside Sainte Foy de Montgomerie in Normandy. Rommel's vehicle was strafed and the driver lost control. The car then struck a tree and spun off the road, ejecting Rommel and fracturing his skull. 602 Squadron mate Jacques Remlinger and Canadian pilot Charley Fox also claimed responsibility for the attack.

Le Roux was reported missing after his aircraft failed to arrive in England on 19 September 1944.

References

1920 births
1944 deaths
Royal Air Force pilots of World War II
South African World War II flying aces
Recipients of the Distinguished Flying Cross (United Kingdom)
Royal Air Force personnel killed in World War II
Royal Air Force squadron leaders
People from Lesedi Local Municipality
Missing in action of World War II